Alboni is the surname of:

 Marietta Alboni (1826–1894), Italian contralto opera singer
 Paolo Alboni (1671–1734), Italian painter
 Edgardo Alboni (1919–2015), Italian partisan and politician
 Roberto Alboni (1963-), Italian politician

Italian-language surnames